Sulaiman Khateeb (1922–1978) was an Urdu, Deccani poet.

References

External links
http://www.thehindu.com/todays-paper/tp-national/tp-karnataka/sslc-toppers-to-be-feted/article125698.ece
http://www.thehindu.com/todays-paper/tp-national/tp-andhrapradesh/mizahia-mushaira-sets-off-guffaws/article2829976.ece
http://www.karnatakamuslims.com/portal/great-deccani-urdu-poet-sulaiman-khateeb-on-the-web/
Home page
http://www.siasat.com/english/news/suleman-khateeb%E2%80%99s-dakhini-urdu-poetry-reforms-society-%E2%80%93-mr-zahid-ali-khan
http://timesofindia.indiatimes.com/topic/Sulaiman-Khateeb
http://www.siasat.com/english/news/sulaiman-khateeb-memorial-function
http://www.caravanmagazine.in/arts/god-small-verse-dakhani-poetry-khateeb

Urdu-language poets from India
1922 births
1978 deaths
20th-century Indian poets
Indian male poets
20th-century Indian male writers